Shahbaba may refer to:
 Shahbaba, Rudbar-e Jonubi
 Shahbaba, Jazmurian, Rudbar-e Jonubi County